WBKG may refer to:

 WBKG (FM), a radio station (88.9 FM) licensed to Macon, Georgia, United States
 Keningau Airport, in Keningau, Sabah, Malaysia (ICAO code WBKG)